Westrum is a surname. Notable people with the surname include:

Erik Westrum (born 1979), American ice hockey player
Pat Westrum (born 1948), American ice hockey player 
Ron Westrum (born 1945), American sociologist
Wes Westrum (1922–2002), American baseball player, coach, manager, and scout